Burrock'n Roll is a demo tape by Spanish rock band Platero y Tú released in 1990. It was reissued by DRO on 24 February 1992.
The outro of the song "Si tú te vas" is taken from Status Quo's version of the song Rockin' All Over the World.

Several songs from the album were re-recorded and released as part of the band's follow-up and mainstream debut Voy a Acabar Borracho.

Track listing
1990 original track listing

1992 reissue track listing

Personnel 
 Fito Cabrales: Vocals and guitar.
 Iñaki "Uoho" Antón: Guitar.
 Juantxu Olano: Bass.
 Jesús García: Drums.

References

External links 
 Platero y Tú official website (in Spanish)

1990 albums
Demo albums
Platero y Tú albums
Spanish-language albums